Craig Alan Richards (born 10 October 1959) is a Welsh former professional footballer who played as a midfielder in the Football League.

References

1959 births
Living people
Footballers from Neath
Welsh footballers
Association football midfielders
Wimbledon F.C. players
Queens Park Rangers F.C. players
English Football League players